Tissanna Hickling (born 7 January 1998) is a Jamaican athlete specialising in the long jump. She represented her country at the 2019 World Championships in Doha without reaching the final. Earlier that year she won a bronze medal at the 2019 Pan American Games.

She has qualified to represent Jamaica at the 2020 Summer Olympics.

Her personal best in the event is 6.82 metres (+1.7 m/s) set in Kingston in 2019).

International competitions

Notes

References

1998 births
Living people
Jamaican female long jumpers
World Athletics Championships athletes for Jamaica
Athletes (track and field) at the 2019 Pan American Games
Jamaican Athletics Championships winners
Pan American Games medalists in athletics (track and field)
Pan American Games bronze medalists for Jamaica
Medalists at the 2019 Pan American Games
Athletes (track and field) at the 2020 Summer Olympics
Olympic athletes of Jamaica
20th-century Jamaican women
21st-century Jamaican women